Varma Pension Insurance Company (Finnish: Keskinäinen työeläkevakuutusyhtiö Varma) is a pension insurance company in Finland. Varma manages statutory TyEL insurance for employees and YEL insurance for the self-employed and statutory vocational rehabilitation and services relating to predicting and managing work ability risks. Varma is a mutual company and its head office is located in Salmisaari, Helsinki.

In 2021, Varma paid out pensions in the amount of 6.2 billion euros to 346,000 people, and at year-end 571,229 people were insured with Varma. In terms of turnover, Varma was the twelfth-biggest company in Finland in 2020. In 2021, Varma was one of the largest real estate investors in Finland.

References

Further reading

External links 

Financial services companies established in 1998
Insurance companies of Finland